The Late-October 1996 tornado outbreak was an unusual tornadic event that affected Nebraska, South Dakota and Minnesota on October 26, 1996. A total of 26 tornadoes would touch down on what turned out to be a record breaking late-season tornado outbreak.

Outbreak description
The outbreak started in Nebraska as three tornadoes touched down from 7:23 am - 9:00 am.  The favorable dynamics then shifted northward to South Dakota, where nine tornadoes touched down from 11:30 am – 12:30 pm.  Finally, 14 more tornadoes touched down in Minnesota during the middle and late afternoon hours.  Of the 26 tornadoes that touched down that day, five of them were rated as F2, with the rest being F0 and F1.  Because these tornadoes formed from low-topped supercells, the tornadoes that formed were relatively weak.  There were no fatalities, fifteen were injured and there was $1.4 million in damage; most of which occurred in rural areas of west-central Minnesota

What makes this outbreak notable is the time of year that it took place.  Typically early fall is a very quiet time of the year for tornadoes in the United States, and the ones that do form usually touch down in the Southern United States.  In Minnesota, prior to this outbreak there had been only ten tornadoes ever recorded during the month of October, so the fourteen tornadoes on this day easily eclipsed most late season outbreak records.

Tornadoes

Confirmed tornadoes

See also
 Climate of Minnesota
 List of North American tornadoes and tornado outbreaks

References

F2 tornadoes
Tornadoes of 1996
Tornadoes in Minnesota
Tornadoes in Nebraska
Tornadoes in South Dakota
Tornado 1996-10
Tornado 1996-10
Tornado 1996-10
Tornado 1996-10
Tornado